Scamandrius or Skamandrios may refer to:

 Astyanax, son of Hector and Andromache
 Helenus of Troy, son of Priam
 Scamandrius (Trojan war), a Trojan warrior.
 Skamandrios (moon), satellite of the asteroid 624 Hektor
 Scamandrius, eponymous archon 510–509 BC